Fenoarivo (Antananarivo) is a suburb and a rural commune in Analamanga Region, in the  Central Highlands of Madagascar. It belongs to the district of Antananarivo-Atsimondrano and its populations numbers to 25,675 in 2018.

This suburb is crossed by the National Road 1.

References

Populated places in Analamanga